Henryk Hilarowicz (born 1890 in Warsaw, Congress Poland, Russian Empire, died 3/4 July 1941 in Lwów, Nazi-occupied Poland) was a Polish surgeon, and a professor at the Jan Kazimierz University in Lwów. He was murdered by the Nazis in the Massacre of Lwów professors.

Further reading
 

1890 births
1941 deaths
Physicians from Warsaw
People from Warsaw Governorate
Polish surgeons
Academic staff of the University of Lviv
Polish people of the Polish–Ukrainian War
Victims of the Massacre of Lwów professors
Executed people from Masovian Voivodeship
20th-century surgeons